The Daimler Scout Car, known in service as the Daimler Dingo (after the Australian wild dog), is a British light, fast four-wheel drive reconnaissance vehicle also used for liaison during the Second World War.

Design and development 

In 1938, the British War Office issued a specification for a scouting vehicle. Three British motor manufacturers, Alvis, BSA Cycles and Morris, were invited to supply prototypes. Alvis had been in partnership with Nicholas Straussler and provided armoured cars to the Royal Air Force, Morris had participated in trials and production of armoured cars and BSA Cycles – whose parent Birmingham Small Arms (BSA) was involved in armaments – had a small front wheel drive vehicle in production.

Testing began in August 1938. All were of similar size and layout – rear engine and all four-wheel-drive. The Morris design was eliminated first – suffering from poor speed even after modification by its builders. The Alvis prototype – known as "Dingo" – could manage  over a cross-country course but had a high centre of gravity.

The BSA prototype was completed in September and handed over for testing. By December, it had covered  on- and off-road with few mechanical problems. Policy from the War Office changed to a requirement for an armoured roof. The BSA vehicle needed a more powerful engine and strengthened suspension. It was chosen over the Alvis and the first order (172 vehicles) for the "Car, Scout, Mark I" was placed in May 1939. The actual production was passed to Daimler, which was a vehicle manufacturer in the BSA group of companies.

The potential of the design was recognised, and it served as the basis for the development of a larger armoured car – a "light tank (Wheeled)", which would later become the Daimler Armoured Car. The first pilot vehicle was built by the end of 1939, later to be named 'Daimler Scout Car' but already known by the name of the Alvis design - the Dingo.

The layout of the H-drive drive train contributed greatly to its low silhouette, agility and - an important consideration in any vehicle used for reconnaissance, an exceptionally quiet engine and running gear. Power was led forward to a centrally placed transfer box and single differential driving separate left- and right-hand shafts, each in turn running forwards and back to a bevel box powering each wheel. This compact layout resulted in a low-slung vehicle with a flat plate that allowed the Dingo to slide across uneven ground but made the Dingo extremely vulnerable to mines.

No spare wheel was carried, considered unnecessary because of the use of run-flat (nearly solid) rubber tyres rather than pneumatic types vulnerable to punctures. Despite hard tyres, independent coil suspension gave each wheel approximately  vertical deflection and coil springs all round gave a comfortable ride.

A swivelling seat beside the driver allowed the second crewmember to attend to the No. 19 wireless set or Bren gun. The driver's seat was canted slightly off to the left of the vehicle which, in conjunction with a hinged vision flap in the rear armour, allowed the driver to drive in reverse and look behind by looking over his left shoulder, a useful feature in a reconnaissance vehicle where quick retreats were sometimes necessary.

The Dingo remained in production throughout the war but to bring other production resources into use, the design was passed to Ford Canada, where an equivalent vehicle ("Scout Car, Ford, Mk.I", also called "Lynx") was built with a more powerful, Ford V8 , engine, transmission and running gear. The vehicle superficially resembled the Dingo in general arrangement and body shape, was approximately a foot longer, wider and taller, a ton and a half heavier, less nimble [the turning circle was ] and was louder. While rugged and dependable, it was not as popular as the Dingo, due to the intended use of covert intelligence gathering. Total production figures for each type were 6,626 for the Dingo (all marks) 1939–1945 and 3,255 for the Lynx 1942–1945.

Service
The Dingo was first used by the British Expeditionary Force (1st Armoured Division and 4th Royal Northumberland Fusiliers) during the Battle of France. It turned out to be so successful that no replacement was sought until 1952 with the production of the Daimler Ferret. Principal users were reconnaissance units with a typical late-war recce troop consisting of two Daimler Armoured Cars and two Daimler Dingoes. The vehicle was highly sought-after with damaged Dingoes often being recovered from vehicle dumps and reconditioned for use as private runabouts. One such 'off establishment' vehicle was rebuilt from two damaged Dingoes in Normandy, 1944, by REME vehicle fitters of 86th Anti-Tank Regiment, Royal Artillery. They operated this Dingo for about a week before a higher-ranking officer spotted it and commandeered it for himself.

Writing in 1968, author R.E. Smith said that all Dingoes had now been withdrawn from British service - except for one used as a runabout at an armoured establishment - but some might have remained in Territorial Army storage at that date. Many were also purchased from Canada by the Union Defence Force after the Second World War, though few South African examples have survived to the present day, and were also procured in large numbers for Commonwealth patrols during the Malayan Emergency.  In Vietnam, one ex South Vietnamese, Canadian Lynx was found on installation and used as a liaison vehicle by the 4th Cavalry Regiment. In the mid-1970s, the Dingo was still being used by Cyprus, Portugal and Sri Lanka. Some may have been in reserve store with other minor nations. Surviving vehicles are now popular with historical re-enactors with reconditioned Dingoes commanding a good price.

Variants 

Production went through 5 variants, which were mostly minor improvements. 6,626 vehicles were produced from 1939 to 1945.
 Mk I - original model with four-wheel steering and sliding roof
 Mk IA - as Mark I but with a folding roof
 Mk IB - reversed engine cooling air flow and revised armour grilles for radiator
 Mk II - As the Mk IB but with steering on the front wheels only and revision of the lighting equipment
 Mk III - Produced with a waterproofed ignition system. No roof.

Non-Daimler variants

Ford Lynx Scout Car

A closely related vehicle, the Lynx Scout Car, or "Car, Scout, Ford Mark I" was produced by Ford Canada in Windsor, Ontario. The Lynx design grafted a Dingo hull onto a chassis fitted with a conventional four-wheel drive and running gear. While the engine was much more powerful the gearbox and suspension were inferior. The type entered service in 1943.
 Mk I.
 Mk II - strengthened chassis, no roof, extra storage, revised engine grilles

Autoblinda Lince

Another Dingo clone, the Autoblindo Lince was developed by Lancia, Italy. In 1943–1944, 129 cars were built. They were employed by both German and RSI forces.

Notes

References

External links

 Car, Scout, Daimler Mark II (E1985.96) - tank museum accession record
 The Dingo on exhibit at the Tank Museum
 Ford Lynx Scout Car at mapleleafup.org
 Daimler Scout Car 'Dingo' wwiivehicles.com
 The Daimler Fighting Vehicles Project
 1938 Performance report on Dingo
 Photo of New Zealand Div Cav Daimler Dingo in Italy, 1944
 Daimler Dingo/Ford Lynx Scout Car index - warwheels.net
 Surviving Dingo and Lynx Armoured Cars

Internal security vehicles
World War II scout cars
World War II armoured fighting vehicles of the United Kingdom
Scout cars of the United Kingdom
Wheeled reconnaissance vehicles
Dingo
Military vehicles introduced from 1940 to 1944